Laupala is a genus of crickets belonging to the family Trigonidiidae.

Species:

Laupala cerasina 
Laupala eukolea 
Laupala eupacifica 
Laupala fugax 
Laupala hapapa 
Laupala hualalai 
Laupala kai 
Laupala kanaele 
Laupala kauaiensis 
Laupala kohalensis 
Laupala kokeensis 
Laupala kolea 
Laupala koloa 
Laupala kona 
Laupala lanaiensis 
Laupala makaio 
Laupala makaweli 
Laupala media 
Laupala mediaspisa 
Laupala melewiki 
Laupala molokaiensis 
Laupala neospisa 
Laupala nigra 
Laupala nui 
Laupala oahuensis 
Laupala olohena 
Laupala pacifica 
Laupala paranigra 
Laupala parapacifica 
Laupala paraprosea 
Laupala prosea 
Laupala pruna 
Laupala spisa 
Laupala tantalis 
Laupala vespertina 
Laupala waikemoi 
Laupala wailua

References

Trigonidiidae